The Hungarian Defence Forces awards four classes Parachutist Badges to those qualified as military parachutists.  The latest version is awarded since 1990.

History

1940–1945
The first official Parachutist Badges were introduced into the Royal Hungarian Army on February 14. 1940. A domed parachute opened with two wings at each side, and in the middle a skull, and underneath two crossed fighting knives. Two classes were awarded. A gold sawn on a green cloth for officers, and silver sawn on a green cloth for NCO's and conscripted soldiers. The badges were worn above the wright pocketflaps. Their parameters were: 80x36 mm, and the parachute 25 mm's wide.
There were also metal badges introduced during the war for combat uniforms. Because if a Hungarian paratrooper was captured by Soviet troops they were shot immediately.
The famous Royal Hungarian 1st Parachute Battalion, later regiment was formed as the Kingdom of Hungary's primary airborne force. Its first commanding officer was Major vitéz Árpád Bertalan. After his death Captain István Ugron was his successor.

1945–1989
After Hungary was defeated during World War II a new democratic army was created with new symbols. A new parachutist badge was also created. The coat of arms of Hungary replaced the skull and crossed knives.

After the sovietification of Hungary again new badges were introduced in March 14. 1950. It came in three classes: Parachutist, Masterjumper, Instructor.
They were soviet style badges with red stars and symbols.

After 1990
After the Soviet Army left Hungary the Hungarian Defence Forces were created. The new army took on traditions of the Royal Hungarian Army. New parachutist ratings and badges were created in 1993.
Gold sawn for officers, silver sawn to warrant officers and NCO's, brown for conscripted and contracted soldiers. The ratings are worn on the left side of the uniform above the ribbonbar.

After 30 years of hard work by active Hungarian military paratroopers, researchers, and experts, from December 14, 2021, soldiers with parachute training can wear the embroidered version of the badge again, 81 years after its first appearance in 1940. The badge is called 1940/2021M Parachutist Badge.

There are also four classes created for parachute rated personnel.
Gold laurel 1st class parachutist badge
1st class parachutist badge
2nd class parachutist badge
3rd class parachutist badge

References

See also
 Parachutist Badge (United Kingdom)
 Parachutist Badge (United States)
 Parachutist Badge (Germany)
 Szent László Infantry Division

Parachutist badges